Single of the Year is an Aotearoa Music Award that honours New Zealand music artists for outstanding singles. For the purpose of the award, a single is defined as a song released separately from an album, either for sale or as a music video serviced to New Zealand television. The award was first awarded in 1973, following the Loxene Golden Disc award from 1965-1972. Lorde is the biggest winner in this category with four victories.

Recipients

Loxene Golden Disc (1965-1972)

Single of the Year (1973-current)

References

Single of the Year
Song awards
Awards established in 1973